Dejan Mitrović (Serbian Cyrillic: Дејан Митровић; born February 2, 1973) is a retired Serbian football player.

Career
After playing with OFK Beograd still a youngster, he will move in 1992 to Belgium where he will spend most of his career. After playing initially with a minor club Nijlen, he moved in 1994 to FC Kapellen and will play afterwards for several other Belgian clubs, such as Belgian First Division clubs KVC Westerlo, R.E. Mouscron and, later on, with Royal Antwerp FC and lower league KFC Lille. In between, he will also have spells in Cyprus, with Anorthosis Famagusta and Anagennisi Dherynia, and in Portugal, with C.F. União from Madeira.

External links
 
 

Living people
1973 births
Serbian footballers
Serbian expatriate footballers
OFK Beograd players
K.V.C. Westerlo players
Royal Excel Mouscron players
Belgian Pro League players
Challenger Pro League players
Expatriate footballers in Belgium
Anorthosis Famagusta F.C. players
Anagennisi Deryneia FC players
Expatriate footballers in Cyprus
C.F. União players
Expatriate footballers in Portugal
Royal Antwerp F.C. players
Association football midfielders
Royal Cappellen F.C. players
Cypriot First Division players
Liga Portugal 2 players